{{Infobox airport
| name                   = Perpignan – Rivesaltes Airport
| nativename             = Aéroport de Perpignan – Rivesaltes
| image                  = Aéroport_Perpignan-Rivesaltes.jpg
| image-width            = 250
| IATA                   = PGF
| ICAO                   = LFMP
| type                   = Public
| owner                  = 
| operator               = SPLAR Société Publique Locale Aéroportuaire Régionale
| city-served            = Perpignan / Rivesaltes, France
| location               = 
| elevation-f            = 144
| website                = 
| coordinates            = 
| pushpin_map            = France Occitanie
| pushpin_map_caption    = Location of airport in Occitanie region
| pushpin_label          = LFMP
| pushpin_label_position = right
| metric-rwy             = y
| r1-number              = 15/33
| r1-length-m            = 2,500
| r1-surface             = Asphalt
| r2-number              = 13/31
| r2-length-m            = 1,265
| r2-surface             = Asphalt
| stat-year              = 2018
| stat1-header           = Passengers
| stat1-data             = 463,235
| stat2-header           = Passenger traffic change
| stat2-data             =  12.9%
| footnotes              = Source: French AIP, Aeroport.fr
}}

Perpignan–Rivesaltes Airport , also known as Llabanère Airport, as well as Aéroport de Perpignan - Sud de France, is a small international airport near Perpignan and Rivesaltes, both communes'' of the Pyrénées-Orientales Department in the Occitanie region of south France.

Facilities

Airlines and destinations 

The following airlines operate regular scheduled and charter flights at Perpignan–Rivesaltes Airport:

Statistics

Incidents and accidents 
On 27 November 2008, Flight 888T, an Airbus A320 (owned by Air New Zealand) operating for XL Airways Germany, crashed whilst on a test flight from Perpignan–Rivesaltes Airport. The aircraft stalled and crashed into the Mediterranean Sea, killing all seven on board. The aircraft was due to be returned to its original owner.
On 25 July 2019, after rehearsing for a show, one of the France Air Force (Patrouille de France) planes crashed while landing. The pilot was able to escape. Some damage was caused to the fence on the northern side of the airport.

Presidential airplanes 
The airport serves as a maintenance facility for several presidential airplanes, including 5A-ONE, an Airbus A340 that flew Libya's Moammar Gadhafi, as well as Boeing 727s of Benin and Mauritania and an Airbus A340 that flies French President Emmanuel Macron.

References

External links 

 Aéroport de Perpignan-Rivesaltes 
 Aéroport de Perpignan-Rivesaltes (Union des Aéroports Français) 

Airports in Occitania (administrative region)
Airport
Airports established in 1910